Local elections were held in the Province of Quezon on May 9, 2022, as part of the 2022 general election.  Voters will select candidates for all local positions: a town mayor, vice mayor and town councilors, as well as members of the Sangguniang Panlalawigan, the vice-governor, governor and representatives for the four districts of Quezon.

Provincial elections

Gubernatorial election
Parties are as stated in their certificate of candidacies.

Per City/Municipality

Vice Gubernatorial election
Parties are as stated in their certificate of candidacies.
 

Incumbent Samuel Nantes is term-limited and is running for Mayor of Tayabas. His mother, former Philippine Charity Sweepstakes Office board member Betty Nantes, is his party's nominee.

Per City/Municipality

Provincial board elections

1st District

|-
| colspan="5" style="background:black;" |

2nd District

 
|-
| colspan="5" style="background:black;" |

3rd District

|-
| colspan="5" style="background:black;" |

4th District

|-
| colspan="5" style="background:black;" |

Congressional elections

1st District
Incumbent Representative Mark Enverga is running for reelection.

2nd District
Incumbent Representative David Suarez is running for reelection. One of his opponents is former Department of Agriculture Secretary and former representative Proceso Alcala. Another challenger is local artist and civic volunteer Abigail Jashael "Abi" Bagabaldo.

3rd District
Incumbent Representative Aleta Suarez is running for reelection.

4th District
Incumbent Representative Angelina Tan is term-limited and is running for governor. Her son Mike is her party's nominee.

Lucena local elections
Lucena is an independent component city and is not jurisdictionally part of Quezon, but is often grouped with it.

Mayoralty elections
Incumbent Rhoderick Alcala is term-limited and is running for Vice Mayor. His son, Mark is his party's nominee. His opponents are incumbent councilor Sunshine Abcede and incumbent Board Member Romano Franco Talaga. Incumbent Vice Mayor Philip Castillo died on February 19, 2022. He was substituted by Deric Castillo.

Notes
 A^ Vice Mayor Philip Castillo died on February 19, 2022. His son, Deric Castillo, was named as his substitute.

Vice Mayoralty elections
Incumbent Anacleto Alcala III, who assumed post due to the death of Vice Mayor Philip Castillo is running for Vice Governor. Running for the position are incumbent Mayor Rhoderick Alcala, Serafin Meera, Jr. and incumbent councilor Nilo Villapando.

City and municipal elections

1st District
City: Tayabas City
Municipalities: Burdeos, General Nakar, Infanta, Jomalig, Lucban, Mauban, Pagbilao, Panukulan, Patnanungan, Polillo, Real, Sampaloc

Tayabas City
Incumbent Aida Reynoso is running for reelection. Her opponents are incumbent Vice Mayor Manuel Victorio Manaig and incumbent Vice Governor Samuel Nantes.

Burdeos

General Nakar

Infanta

Jomalig

Lucban

Mauban

Pagbilao

Panukulan

Patnanugan

Polilio

Real

Sampaloc

2nd District
City: Lucena City
Municipalities: Candelaria, Dolores, San Antonio, Sariaya, Tiaong

Candelaria
Incumbent Macario Boongaling is running for Vice Mayor. His party nominated incumbent Vice Mayor George Suayan. His opponents are incumbent LMB President Ireneo Boongaling who happens to be the cousin of the incumbent mayor and former Mayor Ferdinand Maliwanag.

Dolores
Incumbent Orlan Calayag is running for reelection.

San Antonio
Erick Wagan is term-limited. His party nominated former Mayor Aniano Ariel Wagan.

Sariaya
Incumbent Marcelo Gayeta is running for reelection unopposed.

Tiaong
Incumbent Ramon Preza is term-limited. His party nominated incumbent Vice Mayor William Razon.

3rd District
Municipalities: Agdangan, Buenavista, Catanauan, General Luna, Macalelon, Mulanay, Padre Burgos, Pitogo, San Andres, San Francisco, San Narciso, Unisan

Agdangan

Buenavista

Catanauan

General Luna

Macalelon

Mulanay

Padre Burgos

Pitogo

San Andres

San Francisco

San Narciso

Unisan

4th District
Municipalities: Alabat, Atimonan, Calauag, Guinayangan, Gumaca, Lopez, Perez, Plaridel, Quezon, Tagkawayan

Alabat

Atimonan

Calauag

Guinayangan

Gumaca

Lopez

Perez

Plaridel

Quezon

Tagkawayan

References

2022 Philippine local elections
Elections in Quezon
May 2022 events in the Philippines
Politics of Quezon
2022 elections in Calabarzon